Asota diana is a moth of the family Erebidae first described by Arthur Gardiner Butler in 1887. It is found on Solomon Islands and in Indonesia.

The wingspan is 56–59 mm.

Subspecies
Asota diana diana (Aru islands, Solomon Islands)
Asota diana tiphlops (Solomon Islands)

References

Asota (moth)
Moths of Indonesia
Moths of Oceania
Moths described in 1887